Birgit Hogefeld (born 27 July 1956) is a former member of the West German Red Army Faction (RAF).

Early life
Born in 1956 in Wiesbaden, Hogefeld joined the RAF in 1984, once she turned clandestine, long after its founding members Andreas Baader, Gudrun Ensslin and Ulrike Meinhof were dead. She became the girlfriend of fellow RAF member Wolfgang Grams and moved in with him.

Arrest
On 27 June 1993, Hogefeld and Grams arrived at a train station in Bad Kleinen where a group of GSG 9 officers were waiting to arrest them (the officers had received a tip-off from a fellow GSG 9 officer who had infiltrated the RAF). According to the GSG 9 men, Hogefeld and Grams started firing at them on sight; Grams fatally shot an officer named Michael Newrzella. According to the police Grams committed suicide and fell on the train tracks. However, it was suspected that Grams did not commit suicide but was shot by GSG 9 officers. The Staatsanwaltschaft Schwerin investigated these allegations and concluded in January 1994 that they were incorrect. Grams' parents challenged this conclusion in court, but it was upheld by five different courts, including the European Court of Human Rights in 1999. Interior Minister Rudolf Seiters took responsibility for the poor conducting and postprocessing of the operation and resigned in July of the year, as well as Chief Federal Prosecutor, Alexander von Stahl.

Sentencing
Several terrorist activities that Hogefeld was later found guilty of by a Higher Court in Germany were;

The murder of a young GI, Edward Pimental, in 1985 to obtain his I.D. to access the grounds of the U.S. Rhein-Main Air Base near Frankfurt. Supposedly Hogefeld lured him to her home after meeting him in a bar, where he was then shot through the neck and killed. Eva Haule was also involved with Pimental's murder.
A bomb attack on the aforementioned U.S. airbase, which killed A1C Frank Scarton and Becky Jo Bristol and left twenty others injured.
A failed assassination attempt on Hans Tietmeyer, former President of the Deutsche Bundesbank.
The destruction of a jail.
Involvement in a terrorist organisation.

In November 1996, she was given a life imprisonment sentence.

In 2008, federal president Horst Köhler denied her clemency request.

Hogefeld was released on parole in June 2011.

References

1956 births
Living people
20th-century criminals
German female murderers
German prisoners sentenced to life imprisonment
Members of the Red Army Faction
People convicted on terrorism charges
People from Wiesbaden
Prisoners sentenced to life imprisonment by Germany